Almourol is a small islet in the middle of the Tagus river in the civil parish of Praia do Ribatejo, located in Portugal's Center Region. The Castle of Almourol, a Portuguese National Monument, is located there. In relation to the Tagus river, the islet is in the middle of it, a few meters below the rivers confluence with the Zêzere River, in front of the town of Tancos.

References

Islands of Portugal
Tagus
River islands of Europe